The Type 711 Hiev-class crane ship was a class of floating cranes built for the Marinearsenal of the German Navy in Kiel and Wilhelmshaven

Development 
Both cranes were built from 24 November 1960 for DM 4.3 million each under construction numbers 983 (Hiev) and 984 (Griep) at the Rheinwerft in Duisburg-Walsum and, after completion, relocated to their home ports via the inland waterways. The ship names are related to the task of the floating cranes and come from Low German: Hiev stands for “to lift” and Griep for “to grab”.

Design 
The self-propelled floating cranes have a triple diesel-electric drive, each consisting of a MWM four-stroke 16-cylinder diesel engine with 442 kW, a three-phase generator with 700 kVA, a direct current drive motor with 350 kW and a Voith-Schneider propeller. One of the propellers is in the bow area, the other two in the stern area.

The double-link luffing jib crane is a MAN product. The lifting capacities are 100 t with a radius of 16.2 m and 50 t with a radius of 28.5 m and a maximum hook height of 35 m above the waterline.

A galley, living quarters for twelve people and workshops allow a sea mission of up to ten days.

Ships of class

Citations

Auxiliary transport ship classes
Auxiliary ships of Germany
Auxiliary ships of the German Navy